Cirsonella paradoxa is a minute sea snail, a marine gastropod mollusc in the family Skeneidae.

Description
The height of the shell attains 1 mm, its diameter 1.5 mm.

Distribution
This marine species is endemic to New Zealand and is found off Three Kings Islands at a depth of 260 m.

References

 Powell A. W. B., New Zealand Mollusca, William Collins Publishers Ltd, Auckland, New Zealand 1979 

paradoxa
Gastropods of New Zealand
Gastropods described in 1937